Gumroad is an e-commerce platform that allows creators to sell products directly to their audience. The platform was founded by Sahil Lavingia in 2011 and is based in San Francisco, California. Gumroad enables creators to sell digital products, such as e-books, music, videos, and software, as well as physical goods. The platform provides creators with tools to create custom landing pages, track sales, and process payments. Gumroad's primary focus is on serving independent creators, such as writers, musicians, and designers, who want to sell their products without going through intermediaries.

History 

Sahil Lavingia built the first iteration of Gumroad over a single weekend in 2011. Sahil is a self-taught developer who has said in an interview that he learned coding by searching through each problem he hit on Google. Lavingia, who was previously the first designer hired at Pinterest and the designer of Turntable.fm, was 19 years old at the time.

The idea for Gumroad came to Lavingia when he wanted to sell a photorealistic icon he had created and realized that the amount of effort it took to sell an item directly to consumers was considerable. He decided to build a service that would make the process as easy as sharing web content.

In February 2012, while still the sole member of Gumroad, Lavingia announced a $1.1 million seed round from a notable group of investors including Accel, Chris Sacca, Max Levchin, SV Angel, Josh Kopelman, Seth Goldstein, Naval Ravikant and Danny Rimer.

Three months later, it was announced that Kleiner Perkins Caufield & Byers (KPCB) had led a $7 million Series A round for Gumroad. The investment was the first made by former Twitter engineering head Michael Abbott as a KPCB partner.

On September 8, 2014, Twitter announced its first commerce product, the Buy Now button, in partnership with Gumroad, the Buy Now and Gumroad partnership was discontinued on January 7, 2017. On September 30, 2014, Gumroad released its first mobile product, a utility iPhone app that acts as a mobile library for content purchased via Gumroad.

Creators on Gumroad 
Many major and independent musicians have sold products via Gumroad, including Eminem, Bon Jovi, Garth Brooks, David Banner, Ryan Leslie and others.

Magnolia Pictures distributes a curated selection of films via Gumroad. Landmark Theatres also curates a selection of films distributed via Gumroad, including Jiro Dreams of Sushi, Man on Wire, Gonzo, Page One: Inside the New York Times, and Jesus Camp.

Best-selling authors like Tim Ferriss, Chris Guillebeau, and John Green also publish their books on Gumroad.

Controversies

NFTs 
On February 5, 2022, cartoonist Box Brown replied to a now-deleted tweet from CEO Sahil Lavingia about a project that uses non-fungible tokens. Brown was concerned if such plans were true. Gumroad announced via Twitter that it did not currently have plans to implement NFTs on the platform.

In response to the controversy related to NFTs, Gumroad's competitors such as Itch.io and Ko-Fi, confirmed that they do not have plans to use NFTs.

See also 

 Online marketplace
 Online shopping
 Digital distribution
Online marketplaces available in the United States

References

External links 

Companies based in San Francisco
Online marketplaces of the United States